In this list of Birds of the Chatham Islands.  In 1995, Chatham Islands County was dissolved and reconstituted by a specific Act of Parliament as the "Chatham Islands Territory", with powers similar to those of territorial authorities and some functions similar to those of a regional council. They form an archipelago in the Pacific Ocean about 650 kilometres (400 mi) east of mainland New Zealand.
This list's taxonomic treatment and nomenclature (common and scientific names) mainly follows the conventions of The Clements Checklist of Birds of the World, 2022 edition. Some supplemental referencing is that of the Avibase Bird Checklists of the World  as of October 2022.
  
The species and subspecies marked extinct became extinct subsequent to humans' arrival in the Chatham Islands. About two thirds of the extinctions occurred after the arrival of Māori but before the arrival of pākehā (European New Zealanders) and the rest since pākehā arrived.

Unless otherwise noted, all species listed below are considered to occur regularly in the Chatham Islands as permanent residents, summer or winter visitors, or migrants. The following codes are used to denote other categories of species:

 (I) Introduced - a species introduced to New Zealand by the actions of humans, either directly or indirectly
 (E) Extinct - a recent species that no longer exists
 (V) Vagrant - birds considered to be accidental visitors, with few modern records

The Checklist of the birds of New Zealand, published in 2010 by Te Papa Press, in association with the Ornithological Society of New Zealand, is an authoritative list of Chatham Island birds.

Ducks, geese, and waterfowl
Order: AnseriformesFamily: Anatidae

The family Anatidae includes the ducks and most duck-like waterfowl, such as geese and swans. These are adapted for an aquatic existence, with webbed feet, bills that are flattened to a greater or lesser extent, and feathers that are excellent at shedding water due to special oils.

 Plumed whistling-duck, Dendrocygna eytoni (V)
 Graylag goose, Anser anser (I)
 Canada goose, Branta canadensis (V)
 Black swan, Cygnus atratus (I)
 Australian shelduck  Tadorna tadornoides (V)
 Putangitangi, Tadorna variegata (V)
 Australasian shoveler, Spatula rhynchotis  (V)
 Pārera, Anas superciliosa 
 Mallard, Anas platyrhynchos (I)
 Pateke, Anas chlorotis 
 Chatham duck, Anas chathamica (E)
 Papango, Aythya novaeseelandiae 
 Chatham Island merganser, Mergus milleneri (E)

New World quail
Order: GalliformesFamily: Odontophoridae

Odontophoridae are not native to the Chatham Islands, but feral populations of one species survives.

 California quail, Callipepla californica (I)

Pigeons and doves
Order: ColumbiformesFamily: Columbidae

Pigeons and doves are stout-bodied birds with short necks and short slender bills with a fleshy cere.

 Rock pigeon, Columba livia (V)
 New Zealand pigeon, Hemiphaga novaeseelandiae
 Chatham pigeon, Hemiphaga chathamensis

Cuckoos
Order: CuculiformesFamily: Cuculidae

The family Cuculidae includes cuckoos, roadrunners and anis. These birds are of variable size with slender bodies, long tails and strong legs. The Old World cuckoos are brood parasites.

 Koekoea, Eudynamys taitensis (V)
 Pipiwharauroa, Chrysococcyx lucidus

Swifts
Order: CaprimulgiformesFamily: Apodidae

Swifts are small birds which spend the majority of their lives flying. These birds have very short legs and never settle voluntarily on the ground, perching instead only on vertical surfaces. Many swifts have long swept-back wings which resemble a crescent or boomerang.

 White-throated needletail, Hirandapus caudacutus  (V)
 Pacific swift, Apus pacificus (V)

Rails, gallinules, and coots
Order: GruiformesFamily: Rallidae

Rallidae is a large family of small to medium-sized birds which includes the rails, crakes, coots and gallinules. Typically they inhabit dense vegetation in damp environments near lakes, swamps or rivers. In general they are shy and secretive birds, making them difficult to observe. Most species have strong legs and long toes which are well adapted to soft uneven surfaces. They tend to have short, rounded wings and to be weak fliers.

 Weka, Gallirallus australis
 Chatham Islands rail, Gallirallus modestus (E)
 Dieffenbach's rail, Gallirallus dieffenbachii (E)
 Buff-banded rail, Gallirallus philippensis 
 Chatham coot, Fulica chathamensis (E)
 Pūkeko, Porphyrio melanotus
 Hawkins's rail, Diaphorapteryx hawkinsi (E)
 Baillon's crake, Zapornia pusilla (V)
 Spotless crake, Zapornia tabuensis (V)

Stilts and avocets
Order: CharadriiformesFamily: Recurvirostridae

Recurvirostridae is a family of large wading birds, which includes the avocets and stilts. The avocets have long legs and long up-curved bills. The stilts have extremely long legs and long, thin straight bills.

 Pied stilt, Himantopus leucocephalus

Oystercatchers
Order: CharadriiformesFamily: Haematopodidae

The oystercatchers are large and noisy plover-like birds, with strong bills used for smashing or prising open molluscs.

 South Island oystercatcher, Haematopus finschi (V)
 Chatham oystercatcher, Haematopus chathamensis

Plovers and lapwings
Order: CharadriiformesFamily: Charadriidae

The family Charadriidae includes the plovers, dotterels and lapwings. They are small to medium-sized birds with compact bodies, short, thick necks and long, usually pointed, wings. They are found in open country worldwide, mostly in habitats near water.

 Black-bellied plover, Pluvialis squatarola (V)
 Pacific golden-plover, Pluvialis fulva 
 Masked lapwing, Vanellus miles 
 Lesser sand-plover, Charadrius mongolus (V)
 Double-banded plover, Charadrius bicinctus
 Oriental plover, Charadrius veredus (V)
 Tuturuatu, Thinornis novaeseelandiae 
 Wrybill, Anarhynchus frontalis (V)

Sandpipers and allies
Order: CharadriiformesFamily: Scolopacidae

 Whimbrel, Numenius phaeopus (V)
 Far Eastern curlew, Numenius madagascarensis (V)
 Bar-tailed godwit, Limosa lapponica
 Black-tailed godwit, Limosa limosa (V)
 Hudsonian godwit, Limosa haemastica (V)
 Ruddy turnstone, Arenaria interpres 
 Huahou, Calidris canutus
 Sharp-tailed sandpiper, Calidris acuminata (V)
 Curlew sandpiper, Calidris ferruginea (V)
 Red-necked stint, Calidris ruficollis (V)
 Sanderling, Calidris alba (V)
 Pectoral sandpiper, Calidris melanotos (V)
 Chatham Islands snipe, Coenocorypha pusilla
 Forbes's snipe, Coenocorypha chathamica (E)
 Gray-tailed tattler, Tringa brevipes (V)
 Wandering tattler, Tringa incana (V)
 Common greenshank, Tringa nebularia (V)
 Lesser yellowlegs, Tringa flavipes (V)
 Marsh sandpiper, Tringa stagnatilis (V)

Skuas and jaegers
Order: CharadriiformesFamily: Stercorariidae

The family Stercorariidae are, in general, medium to large birds, typically with grey or brown plumage, often with white markings on the wings. They nest on the ground in temperate and arctic regions and are long-distance migrants.

 South polar skua, Stercorarius maccormicki (V)
 Brown skua, Stercorarius antarcticus
 Pomarine jaeger, Stercorarius pomarinus (V)
 Parasitic jaeger, Stercorarius parasiticus  
 Long-tailed jaeger, Stercorarius longicaudus (V)

Gulls, terns, and skimmers
Order: CharadriiformesFamily: Laridae

Laridae is a family of medium to large seabirds, the gulls, terns, and skimmers. Gulls are typically grey or white, often with black markings on the head or wings. They have stout, longish bills and webbed feet. Terns are a group of generally medium to large seabirds typically with grey or white plumage, often with black markings on the head. Most terns hunt fish by diving but some pick insects off the surface of fresh water. Terns are generally long-lived birds, with several species known to live in excess of 30 years. Skimmers are a small family of tropical tern-like birds. They have an elongated lower mandible which they use to feed by flying low over the water surface and skimming the water for small fish.

 Silver gull, Chroicocephalus novaehollandiae 
 Karoro,  Larus dominicanus 
 Sooty tern Onychoprion fuscatus 
 Little tern, Sternula albifrons (V)
 Taranui, Hydroprogne caspia (V)
 Black-fronted tern Chlidonias albostriatus (V)
 White-fronted tern Sterna striata
 Arctic tern, Sterna paradisaea (V)
 Antarctic tern, Sterna vittata (V)

Penguins
Order: SphenisciformesFamily: Spheniscidae

Penguins are a group of aquatic, flightless birds living almost exclusively in the Southern Hemisphere, especially in Antarctica.

 King penguin, Aptenodytes patagonicus (V) 
 Yellow-eyed penguin, Megadyptes antipodes (V)
 Little penguin, Eudyptula minor 
 Erect-crested penguin, Eudyptes sclateri 
 Royal penguin, Eudyptes schlegeli (V)
 Southern rockhopper penguin, Eudyptes chrysocome (V)
 Moseley's rockhopper penguin, Eudyptes moseleyi (V)
 Snares penguin, Eudyptes robustus (V)
 Chatham penguin,  'Eudyptes' chathamensis (E)

Albatrosses
Order: ProcellariiformesFamily: Diomedeidae

The albatrosses are a family of large seabird found across the Southern and North Pacific Oceans. The largest are among the largest flying birds in the world.

 Yellow-nosed albatross, Thalassarche chlororhynchos (V) - endangered 
 Gray-headed albatross, Thalassarche chrysostoma (V) - endangered
 Buller's albatross, Thalassarche bulleri - near-threatened
 White-capped albatross, Thalassarche cauta - near-threatened
 Salvin's albatross, Thalassarche salvini - vulnerable
 Chatham albatross, Thalassarche eremita - vulnerable
 Black-browed albatross, Thalassarche melanophris - near-threatened
 Sooty albatross, Phoebetria fusca (V) - endangered
 Light-mantled albatross, Phoebetria palpebrata (V) - near-threatened
 Royal albatross, Diomedea epomophora - vulnerable
 Wandering albatross, Diomedea exulans - vulnerable

Southern storm-petrels
Order: ProcellariiformesFamily: Oceanitidae

The southern storm-petrels are the smallest seabirds, relatives of the petrels, feeding on planktonic crustaceans and small fish picked from the surface, typically while hovering. Their flight is fluttering and sometimes bat-like.

 Wilson's storm-petrel, Oceanites oceanicus
 Gray-backed storm-petrel, Garrodia nereis
 White-faced storm-petrel,  Pelagodroma marina
 Black-bellied storm-petrel, Fregetta tropica

Northern storm-petrels
Order: ProcellariiformesFamily: Hydrobatidae

Though the members of this family are similar in many respects to the southern storm-petrels, including their general appearance and habits, there are enough genetic differences to warrant their placement in a separate family.

 Leach's storm-petrel, Hydrobates leucorrhous (V)

Shearwaters and petrels
Order: ProcellariiformesFamily: Procellariidae

The procellariids are the main group of medium-sized "true petrels", characterised by united nostrils with medium nasal septum, and a long outer functional primary flight feather.

 Southern giant-petrel, Macronectes giganteus (V)
 Northern giant-petrel, Macronectes halli 
 Southern fulmar, Fulmarus glacialoides (V)
 Antarctic petrel, Thalassoica antarctica (V)
 Cape petrel, Daption capense
 Kerguelen petrel, Aphrodroma brevirostris (V)
 Gray-faced petrel, Pterodroma gouldi
 Kermadec petrel, Pterodroma neglecta (V)
 Magenta petrel, Pterodroma magentae
 Soft-plumaged petrel, Pterodroma mollis (V)
 White-headed petrel, Pterodroma lessonii (V)
 Imber's petrel, Pterodroma imberi (E)
 Mottled petrel, Pterodroma inexpectata (V) 
 Juan Fernandez petrel, Pterodroma externa (V)
 Black-winged petrel, Pterodroma nigripennis 
 Chatham petrel, Pterodroma axillaris 
 Cook's petrel, Pterodroma cookii
 Pycroft's petrel, Pterodroma pycrofti 
 Blue petrel, Halobaena caerulea (V) 
 Fairy prion, Pachyptila turtur 
 Broad-billed prion, Pachyptila vittata
 Salvin's prion, Pachyptila salvini (V)
 Antarctic prion, Pachyptila desolata (V)
 Fulmar prion, Pachyptila crassirostris 
 Gray petrel, Procellaria cinerea (V)
 White-chinned petrel, Procellaria aequinoctialis (V)
 Parkinson's petrel, Procellaria parkinsoni (V)
 Westland petrel, Procellaria westlandica (V)
 Flesh-footed shearwater, Ardenna carneipes (V)
 Great shearwater, Ardenna gravis (V)
 Buller's shearwater, Ardenna bulleri
 Sooty shearwater, Ardenna griseus 
 Short-tailed shearwater, Ardenna tenuirostris (V)
 Fluttering shearwater, Puffinus gavia (V)
 Little shearwater, Puffinus assimilis 
 Subantarctic shearwater, Puffinus elegans 
 Common diving-petrel, Pelecanoides urinatrix
 South Georgia diving-petrel, Pelecanoides georgicus

Frigatebirds
Order: SuliformesFamily: Fregatidae

Frigatebirds are large seabirds usually found over tropical oceans. They are large, black-and-white, or completely black, with long wings and deeply forked tails. The males have colored inflatable throat pouches. They do not swim or walk and cannot take off from a flat surface. Having the largest wingspan-to-body-weight ratio of any bird, they are essentially aerial, able to stay aloft for more than a week.
  
 Lesser frigatebird, Fregata ariel (V)

Boobies and gannets
Order: SuliformesFamily: Sulidae

The sulids comprise the gannets and boobies. Both groups are medium-large coastal seabirds that plunge-dive for fish.

 Australasian gannet, Morus serrator (V)

Cormorants and shags
Order: SuliformesFamily: Phalacrocoracidae

Cormorants are medium-to-large aquatic birds, usually with mainly dark plumage and areas of coloured skin on the face. The bill is long, thin and sharply hooked. Their feet are four-toed and webbed, a distinguishing feature among the order Pelecaniformes.

 Little pied cormorant, Microcarbo melanoleucos - vagrant
 Great cormorant, Phalacrocorax carbo (Māori, kawau)
 Spotted shag, Phalacrocorax punctatus
 Pitt Island shag, Phalacrocorax featherstoni - endangered
 Little black cormorant, Microcarbo sulcirostris
 Chatham Islands shag, Phalacrocorax onslowi - critically endangered

Herons, egrets, and bitterns
Order: PelecaniformesFamily: Ardeidae

The family Ardeidae contains the bitterns, herons, and egrets. Herons and egrets are medium to large wading birds with long necks and legs. Bitterns tend to be shorter necked and more wary. Members of Ardeidae fly with their necks retracted, unlike other long-necked birds such as storks, ibises and spoonbills.

 Australasian bittern, Botaurus poiciloptilus - endangered
 New Zealand bittern, Ixobrychus novaezelandiae (E)
 Great egret, Ardea alba
 White-faced heron, Egretta novaehollandiae 
 Pacific reef-heron, Egretta sacra (V)
 Cattle egret, Bubulcus ibis (V)

Ibises and spoonbills
Order: PelecaniformesFamily: Threskiornithidae

Threskiornithidae is a family of large terrestrial and wading birds which includes the ibises and spoonbills. They have long, broad wings with 11 primary and about 20 secondary feathers. They are strong fliers and despite their size and weight, very capable soarers.

 Glossy ibis, Plegadis falcinellus (V)
 Royal spoonbill, Platalea regia (V)

Hawks, eagles, and kites
Order: AccipitriformesFamily: Accipitridae

Accipitridae is a family of birds of prey, which includes hawks, eagles, kites, harriers and Old World vultures. These birds have powerful hooked beaks for tearing flesh from their prey, strong legs, powerful talons and keen eyesight.

 Kahu, Circus approximans

Owls
Order: StrigiformesFamily: Strigidae

The typical owls are small to large solitary nocturnal birds of prey. They have large forward-facing eyes and ears, a hawk-like beak, and a conspicuous circle of feathers around each eye called a facial disk.

 Morepork, Ninox novaeseelandiae (Māori, ruru)

Kingfishers
Order: CoraciiformesFamily: Alcedinidae

Kingfishers are medium-sized birds with large heads, long pointed bills, short legs, and stubby tails.

Sacred kingfisher, Todiramphus sacra (Māori, kōtare) (V)

Falcons and caracaras
Order: FalconiformesFamily: Falconidae

Falconidae is a family of diurnal birds of prey. They differ from hawks, eagles, and kites in that they kill with their beaks instead of their talons.

 New Zealand falcon, Falco novaeseelandiae (Māori, kārearea)

New Zealand parrots
Order: PsittaciformesFamily: Strigopidae

The New Zealand parrot superfamily, Strigopoidea, consists of at least three genera of parrots – Nestor, Strigops, the fossil Nelepsittacus, and probably the fossil Heracles. The genus Nestor consists of the kea, kaka, Norfolk Island kaka and Chatham Island kaka, while the genus Strigops contains the iconic kakapo. All extant species are endemic to New Zealand. The species of the genus Nelepsittacus were endemics of the main islands, while the two extinct species of the genus Nestor were found at the nearby oceanic islands such as Chatham Island of New Zealand, and Norfolk Island and adjacent Phillip Island.
 
 Chatham kaka, Nestor chathamensis (E)

Old world parrots
Order: PsittaciformesFamily: Psittaculidae

Characteristic features of parrots include a strong curved bill, an upright stance, strong legs, and clawed zygodactyl feet. Many parrots are vividly coloured, and some are multi-coloured. Old World parrots are found from Africa east across south and southeast Asia and Oceania to Australia and New Zealand.

 Kakariki, Cyanoramphus novaezelandiae - vulnerable
 Chatham Islands parakeet, Cyanoramphus forbesi

Honeyeaters
Order: PasseriformesFamily: Meliphagidae

The honeyeaters are a large and diverse family of small to medium-sized birds most common in Australia and New Guinea. They are nectar feeders and closely resemble other nectar-feeding passerines.

 Tui, Prosthemadera novaeseelandiae 
 Chatham Island bellbird, Anthornis melanocephala (E)

Thornbills and allies
Order: PasseriformesFamily: Acanthizidae

Thornbills are small passerine birds, similar in habits to the tits.

 Grey warbler, Gerygone igata
 Chatham Island gerygone, Gerygone albofrontata

Fantails
Order: PasseriformesFamily: Rhipiduridae

The fantails are small insectivorous birds which are specialist aerial feeders.

 Willie wagtail, Rhipidura leucophrys (V)
 Piwakawaka, Rhipidura fuliginosa

Crows, jays, and magpies
Order: PasseriformesFamily: Corvidae

The family Corvidae includes crows, ravens, jays, choughs, magpies, treepies, nutcrackers and ground jays. Corvids are above average in size among the Passeriformes, and some of the larger species show high levels of intelligence.

 Rook, Corvus frugilegus (V)
 Chatham raven, Corvus moriorum (E)

Australasian robins
Order: PasseriformesFamily: Petroicidae

Most species of Petroicidae have a stocky build with a large rounded head, a short straight bill and rounded wingtips. They occupy a wide range of wooded habitats, from subalpine to tropical rainforest, and mangrove swamp to semi-arid scrubland. All are primarily insectivores, although a few supplement their diet with seeds.

 Miromiro, Petroica macrocephala 
 Chatham robin, Petroica traversi

Larks
Order: PasseriformesFamily: Alaudidae

Larks are small terrestrial birds with often extravagant songs and display flights. Most larks are fairly dull in appearance. Their food is insects and seeds.

Eurasian skylark, Alauda arvensis (I)

Grassbirds and allies
Order: PasseriformesFamily: Locustellidae 

Locustellidae are a family of small insectivorous songbirds found mainly in Eurasia, Africa, and the Australian region. They are smallish birds with tails that are usually long and pointed, and tend to be drab brownish or buffy all over.

 Chatham Islands fernbird, Megalurus rufescens (E)

Swallows
Order: PasseriformesFamily: Hirundinidae

The family Hirundinidae is adapted to aerial feeding. They have a slender streamlined body, long pointed wings, and a short bill with a wide gape. The feet are adapted to perching rather than walking, and the front toes are partially joined at the base.

 Welcome swallow, Hirundo neoxena 
 Tree martin, Petrochelidon nigricans (V)

White-eyes, yuhinas, and allies
Order: PasseriformesFamily: Zosteropidae

The white-eyes are small birds of rather drab appearance, the plumage above being typically greenish-olive, but some species have a white or bright yellow throat, breast, or lower parts, and several have buff flanks. As the name suggests, many species have a white ring around each eye.

 Tauhou, Zosterops lateralis

Starlings
Order: PasseriformesFamily: Sturnidae

Starlings are small to medium-sized passerine birds. Their flight is strong and direct and they are very gregarious. Their preferred habitat is fairly open country. They eat insects and fruit. Plumage is typically dark with a metallic sheen.

 European starling, Sturnus vulgaris (I)

Thrushes and allies
Order: PasseriformesFamily: Turdidae

The thrushes are a group of passerine birds that occur mainly in the Old World. They are plump, soft plumaged, small to medium-sized insectivores or sometimes omnivores, often feeding on the ground. Many have attractive songs.

 Song thrush, Turdus philomelos (I)
 Eurasian blackbird, Turdus merula (I)

Accentors
Order: PasseriformesFamily: Prunellidae

The accentors are in the only bird family, Prunellidae, which is completely endemic to the Palearctic. They are small, fairly drab species superficially similar to sparrows.

Dunnock, Prunella modularis (I)

Old World sparrows
Order: PasseriformesFamily: Passeridae

Old World sparrows are small passerine birds. In general, sparrows tend to be small, plump, brown or grey birds with short tails and short powerful beaks. Sparrows are seed eaters, but they also consume small insects.

 House sparrow, Passer domesticus (I)

Wagtails and pipits
Order: PasseriformesFamily: Motacillidae

Motacillidae is a family of small passerine birds with medium to long tails. They include the wagtails, longclaws and pipits. They are slender, ground feeding insectivores of open country.

 Pīhoihoi, Anthus novaeseelandiae

Finches, euphonias, and allies
Order: PasseriformesFamily: Fringillidae

Finches are seed-eating passerine birds, that are small to moderately large and have a strong beak, usually conical and in some species very large. All have twelve tail feathers and nine primaries. These birds have a bouncing flight with alternating bouts of flapping and gliding on closed wings, and most sing well.

 Common chaffinch, Fringilla coelebs (I)
 European greenfinch, Chloris chloris (I)
 Common redpoll, Acanthis flammea (I)
 Lesser redpoll, Acanthis cabaret (I)
 European goldfinch, Carduelis carduelis (I)

Old World buntings
Order: PasseriformesFamily: Emberizidae

The emberizids are a large family of passerine birds. They are seed-eating birds with distinctively shaped bills. Many emberizid species have distinctive head patterns.

 Yellowhammer, Emberiza citrinella (V)

See also
 Birds of New Zealand
 List of birds
 Lists of birds by region

References

Barrie Heather & Hugh Robertson (1996) The Field Guide to the Birds of New Zealand 
"Splitting headaches? Recent taxonomic changes affecting the British and Western Palaearctic lists" - Martin Collinson, British Birds vol 99 (June 2006), 306-323

External links
 New Zealand Birds online A comprehensive guide to the birds of New Zealand, maintained by Birds New Zealand, the Department of Conservation, and Te Papa. 
 CSV file with names from New Zealand Birds online A list of all New Zealand Birds including common and scientific names, derived from New Zealand Birds online.
 Department of Conservation Information on New Zealand birds from the Department of Conservation.
 Checklist of New Zealand Birds An authoritative list of the birds of New Zealand, Norfolk and Macquarie Islands, and the Ross Dependency, Antarctica.
What Bird? A tool for identifying birds that are likely to be encountered in and around New Zealand forests (not intended to be a complete database of the birds of New Zealand).
 TerraNature New Zealand native birds list.

Chatham Islands